Arango is one of fifteen parishes (administrative divisions) in Pravia, a municipality within the province and autonomous community of Asturias, in northern Spain.

The population is 264 (INE 2007).

Villages and hamlets
 Allence
 Arborio (Arboriu)
 Caunedo (Caunéu)
 La Braña
 La Fungal (La Xungal)
 Las Tablas
 Pontevega (Ponteveiga)
 Prada
 Quintana
 Ribero (Riberu)
 San Pelayo
 Travesedo (Traveséu)

References  

Parishes in Pravia